Larry Tieu (born July 13, 1986) is an American professional basketball player who last played for the Saigon Heat of the ASEAN Basketball League (ABL). Tieu holds dual citizenship in the United States and Vietnam due to his parents having Vietnamese citizenship.

High school
In high school, Tieu attended Rowland High School. He played 4 years of Varsity basketball and started all 4 years. Larry and the Raiders captured league championships in 2002, 2003, and 2004. In the summer prior to his senior year, Larry made the all tournament team at the prestigious 2003 Adidas "Big Time" tournament.  In his senior year, Larry was selected as the San Gabriel Valley Player of the Year.

College
Tieu started his college career at Concordia University in 2004. However, he would leave Concordia in his junior year and would finish his career at Biola University.

Pro career

Saigon Heat
In 2012, Tieu joined the Heat before the start of the 2013 ABL season.

References

External links
 Career statistics and player information from ASEANBasketballLeague.com
 Tieu bio @ athletics.biola.edu

1986 births
Living people
American sportspeople of Vietnamese descent
Basketball players from Los Angeles
Biola University alumni
Biola Eagles men's basketball players
Concordia Eagles men's basketball players
Saigon Heat players
Vietnamese basketball players
American men's basketball players
Guards (basketball)